Ishwar Kanwar Puri (born 1959) is an Indian-American and Canadian scientist, engineer, and academic.

Early life and education
Puri was born in New Delhi, India, in 1959. He studied at St. Xavier’s School, Delhi from 1964 to 1976. He earned a Bachelor's degree in Mechanical Engineering from Delhi College of Engineering of Delhi University, Delhi in 1982, and M.S. (1984) and Ph.D. (1987) degrees in Engineering Science (Applied Mechanics) from the University of California, San Diego.

His mother, Sushila Gaind Puri, was a pioneering anesthesiologist in New Delhi, and his father, Krishan Kanwar Puri, completed his doctoral dissertation from University of Münster in 1955.

Academic publications 
The author of archival publications and books, Puri is listed among the top two percent of scientists in the Updated science-wide author databases of standardized citation indicators based on citations to his work.

Puri has explained the structure and extinction of counterflow diffusion flames, use of magnetic fluids for heat transfer and drug targeting,  how biological inks can be formulated to print mammalian cells into three-dimensional cellular structures with diamagnetophoresis, and provided mathematical models for the progression of disease, such as cancer and Alzheimer's disease.

His books include Combustion Science and Engineering, CRC Press,  Advanced Thermodynamics Engineering, and Environmental Implications of Combustion Processes.

Career
Puri is Senior Vice President of Research & Innovation at University of Southern California, where he oversees the USC Office of Research. He has oversight over protection of human subject research, animal care and use for research, research integrity, research contracts and grants, research advancement, initiatives and facilities, research strategy, and technology, and intellectual property commercialization.

Puri is also Professor of Aerospace and Mechanical Engineering in the USC Viterbi School of Engineering with an appointment in the Mork Family Department of Chemical Engineering & Materials Science.

Before his arrival at USC, Puri served as Dean of the Faculty of Engineering and Professor at McMaster University in Hamilton, Ontario, Canada. Upon his departure from McMaster, the university credited him with developing innovative approaches to engineering education and experiential learning, and furthering research.

Prior to McMaster, Puri served as N. Waldo Harrison Professor and Department Head of Engineering Science and Mechanics at Virginia Tech from 2004-13. He arrived there from the University of Illinois at Chicago after 15 years of service at various ranks, leaving as Professor and Executive Associate Dean of Engineering.

His department at Virginia Tech was housed in Norris Hall, the site of the shooting in 2007, which he experienced. Puri played a role in the reoccupation of that space.

He has served as the elected chair of Engineering Deans Canada (formerly National Council of Deans of Engineering and Applied Science). In 2019, he was appointed as a member of the Council of Natural Sciences and Engineering Research Council of Canada.

Honors and awards
Puri is a Fellow of the Canadian Academy of Engineering, American Association for the Advancement of Science, and American Society of Mechanical Engineers. He received the 2021 Engineering Excellence Award from Professional Engineers Ontario and Ontario Society of Professional Engineers.

Topical and literary contributions
Puri writes on issues at the intersection of science, technology, education and society. His first publication was a book of poetry, Narcissus Wept.

References

External links
Ishwar K. Puri's Google Scholar site
 
Fluid Mechanics and Combustion Tree - Ishwar K. Puri Family Tree

1959 births
American mechanical engineers
American people of Punjabi descent
Canadian academics in engineering
Canadian engineering researchers
Canadian mechanical engineers
Fellows of the Canadian Academy of Engineering
Fellows of the American Association for the Advancement of Science
Fellows of the American Society of Mechanical Engineers
Indian emigrants to the United States
American emigrants to Canada
American academics of Indian descent
Canadian people of Punjabi descent
Living people
University of Southern California faculty
Academic staff of McMaster University
Scientists from Ontario
20th-century Indian scientists
21st-century Indian engineers
21st-century American scientists
21st-century American engineers
21st-century Canadian scientists
21st-century Canadian engineers